Zigurat was a Spanish software house for 8-bit home computers very popular in the eighties during the Golden Era of Spanish Software. Its origin is in the company Made in Spain, founded in 1983, which would know massive success in Spain with Fred, commercialized in the United Kingdom as Roland on the Ropes (only the Amstrad CPC version). When the programmers and owners of Made in Spain could not go on alone on the task of distribution, they decided to create in 1986 another company, Zigurat, which would be entirely dedicated to distribution, and would distribute all the titles by Made in Spain, which became an internal producer seal under Zigurat. They would also distribute games by independent programmers or companies and would allow Made in Spain to concretate solely on programming. Later on, Made in Spain would completely merge into Zigurat, creating a single producer and distributor company. When the 8-bit market disappeared, the company turned to develop games for arcade machines.

Games published 
Fred
Sir Fred
El Misterio del Nilo
Humphrey
París-Dakar
Poder Oscuro
Comando Quatro
Emilio Sánchez Vicario
Arkos
Poder Oscuro
Curro Jiménez
Power Magic
Senda Salvaje
Jungle Warrior
Piso Zero
Don Kin Kong
Sito Pons 500cc Grand Prix
Carlos Sainz: World Rally Championship

Developing groups 
The company had several developing groups associated:

 Made in Spain
 Arcadia
 Gamesoft
 Truesoft
 Turbo 16

References

External links 
Official website
Zigurat videogames at thelegacy.de 

Zigurat at worldofspectrum.org
El Misterio del Nilo at ysrnry.co.uk 

Defunct video game companies of Spain